Liaoning Shenyang Urban Football Club, also sometimes known as Liaoning Shenyang City, is a professional Chinese football club that currently participates in the Chinese League One under licence from the Chinese Football Association (CFA). The team is based in Shenyang and their home stadium is Shenyang Urban Construction University Stadium.

History
Shenyang City F.C. was established by former footballer Zhuang Yi in 2015 with free players from Shenyang Zhongze F.C. which dissolved just before the 2015 China League One season. They enrolled in the 2015 China Football Amateur League, finished in the top 4, and gained promotion to China League Two, before changing the English name of the club to Shenyang Urban F.C..

The club had a lengthy stay in China League Two, making it to the play-off stage twice, in the 2016 and 2018 seasons, but fell short in the first round both times. During the 2018 season, on 12 May 2018, Zhuang Yi, the owner of the club, appeared in a 7–1 home win over Baotou Nanjiao to become the oldest ever player of Chinese professional league at the age of 44 years and 305 days. Zhuang renewed his record on 3 June 2018 in a 4–0 win against Yanbian Beiguo and scored a penalty in the match, making him the oldest scorer in the Chinese professional league at the age of 44 years and 327 days. The club’s effort finally came to fruition in the 2019 China League Two, when they were crowned as champions after beating Chengdu Better City in the finals, as well as gaining a historical promotion to China League One.

In April 2020, the club changed their name to Liaoning Shenyang Urban FC.

Players

Current squad

Coaching staff

Managerial history

  Li Zheng (2015)
  Marek Zub (2016)
  Xiao Zhanbo (2017)
  Wang Bo (2018)
  Niu Hongli (2018)
  Wang Gang (2018)
  Yu Ming (2019–)

Results
All-time league rankings

As of the end of 2019 season.

 in North Group.

Key
 Pld = Played
 W = Games won
 D = Games drawn
 L = Games lost
 F = Goals for
 A = Goals against
 Pts = Points
 Pos = Final position

 DNQ = Did not qualify
 DNE = Did not enter
 NH = Not Held
 – = Does Not Exist
 R1 = Round 1
 R2 = Round 2
 R3 = Round 3
 R4 = Round 4

 F = Final
 SF = Semi-finals
 QF = Quarter-finals
 R16 = Round of 16
 Group = Group stage
 GS2 = Second Group stage
 QR1 = First Qualifying Round
 QR2 = Second Qualifying Round
 QR3 = Third Qualifying Round

References

Football clubs in China